Familie Leitner is an Austrian television series.

See also 
 List of Austrian television series

External links 
 

Austrian television series
ORF (broadcaster)
1958 Austrian television series debuts
1967 Austrian television series endings
1950s Austrian television series
1960s Austrian television series
German-language television shows